The 2012–13 Czech 2. Liga was the 20th season of the Czech Second Division, the second tier of the Czech football league. The season began on 4 August 2012 and finished on 5 June 2013. In addition to the two lowest-placed clubs being relegated, third-placed HFK Olomouc were also relegated due to financial difficulties.

Team changes

From 2. Liga
Promoted to Czech First League
 FC Vysočina Jihlava
 FC Zbrojovka Brno

Relegated to Moravian-Silesian Football League
 FK Fotbal Třinec

Relegated to Bohemian Football League
 Sparta B

To 2. Liga
HFK Olomouc returned to the Czech Second Division after an absence of three seasons.

Relegated from Czech First League
 Bohemians 1905
 FK Viktoria Žižkov

Promoted from Bohemian Football League
 FK Pardubice

Promoted from Moravian-Silesian Football League
 1. HFK Olomouc

Team overview

Notes:
 FK Bohemians Prague played their home match against Bohemians 1905 at Na Litavce in Příbram due to security concerns.

League table

Results

Top goalscorers

See also
 2012–13 Czech First League
 2012–13 Czech Cup

References

External links
2012–13 Czech 2. Liga at Soccerway

Czech 2. Liga seasons
Czech
2012–13 in Czech football